South Carolina Highway 421 (SC 421) is a  state highway in the U.S. state of South Carolina. It is an alternate route to U.S. Route 1 (US 1) and US 78 between North Augusta and Aiken.

Route description
SC 421 begins where it splits off from US 1/US 78 (Jefferson Davis Highway) southwest of Clearwater; it immediately connects with US 278/SC 125 (Atomic Road). Heading northeast, it parallels US 1/US 78 to its south, going through the towns of Clearwater, Burnettown, Langley, Gloverville and Warrenville. Upon entering Aiken, it reconnects with US 1/US 78.

History
SC 421 was established by 1952 as a renumbering of US 1/US 78, which was realigned onto new four-lane routing just north of it.  The route has remained unchanged since inception.

Major intersections

See also

References

External links

 
 SC 421 at Virginia Highways' South Carolina Highways Annex

421
Transportation in Aiken County, South Carolina
Aiken, South Carolina
U.S. Route 1
U.S. Route 78